Klebsiella granulomatis is Gram-negative, rod-shaped bacterium of the genus Klebsiella known to cause the sexually transmitted disease granuloma inguinale (or donovanosis).  It was formerly called Calymmatobacterium granulomatis.

It is a stationary aerobic bacillus with non-sporulated capsule measuring 0.5 to 2.0 μm. It has biochemical properties such as catalase positive, phenylalanine negative and citrate positive with hydrolysis in urea. Among its virulence factors are its capsule, endotoxins, siderophores, antimicrobial resistance and antigenic phase variation.

Incubation period 
The incubation period lasts around 50 days, may vary between 1 and 12 weeks.

Epidemiology 
This rare form of genital ulceration is about to be eradicated worldwide. There are currently alarming figures in areas such as India, Papua New Guinea, the Caribbean, South America, Zambia, Zimbabwe, South Africa and Australia.

Thanks to the recognition as a public health problem and appropriate control measures such as the implementation of better health service provisions, the incidence of this microorganism in countries such as Papua New Guinea, South Africa, India and the Caribbean has decreased significantly.<ref name = "Dixit

References

External links 
 

Enterobacteriaceae
Infections with a predominantly sexual mode of transmission
Bacteria described in 1913